Church of Zion may refer to:

 Church of Zion, Jerusalem, Roman-era church or synagogue on Mount Zion, of which 4th-century remains are visible
 Godbeites, a Latter Day Saints grouping

See also 
 Zion Church (disambiguation)
 Mount Zion Church (disambiguation)
 Zionism (disambiguation)
 Zion (disambiguation)